The Black Robe is a 1944 German drama film directed by Fritz Peter Buch and starring Lotte Koch, Richard Häussler, and Kirsten Heiberg. An ambitious public prosecutor neglects her husband to pursue her career, but has to change when her husband is caught up in a court case.

Cast

References

Bibliography

External links 
 
 Die schwarze Robe Full movie at Deutsche Filmothek

1944 films
Films of Nazi Germany
German drama films
1944 drama films
1940s German-language films
Films directed by Fritz Peter Buch
German black-and-white films
1940s German films